Bezgovica is a small settlement in the Municipality of Osilnica in southern Slovenia. The area is part of the traditional region of Lower Carniola and is now included in the Southeast Slovenia Statistical Region.

Name
Bezgovica was attested in written records as Bosgawitz in 1498.

Cultural heritage
There is a small chapel-shrine at the crossroads south of the settlement dedicated to the Virgin Mary. It dates to the early 20th century.

References

External links
Bezgovica on Geopedia

Populated places in the Municipality of Osilnica